The two-platoon system is a tactic in American football enabled by rules allowing unlimited substitution adopted during the 1940s. The "two platoons", offense and defense, are an integral part of the modern game today.

History

In its earliest iteration, American football -- like the sport of rugby whence it sprung -- featured squads of players alternating on offense and defense in continuous action without leaving the field. This one-platoon system was mandated by rule. Prior to 1932, a player removed during the first half could not return to the field until the second half, while a player removed in the second half was lost for the game. With no limits to the size of a college football roster, a severe competitive advantage was thereby created for large collegiate football programs, which could send in multiple waves of talented players; smaller schools typically experienced a severe talent drop-off between starters and reserves. This provided the impetus for reform of the substitution rule effective with the 1933 season. Henceforth, players could be removed from the game for rest and recuperation and return to action once per quarter. This allowed talented starters to spend more time on the field, enabling small programs to remain more competitive with their larger peers.

A lack of players during World War II, during which many able-bodied college-age men volunteered for or were drafted into military service, provided the rationale for a further loosening of substitution rules. A rule allowing unlimited substitution was initiated, with players now permitted to rest and return as many times as they wished per quarter. The limited pool of talented players was thus better conserved. This rules change had the corollary effect of opening the game to offensive and defensive specialization -- the so-called "two-platoon" system.

The first known use of the "two-platoon" system was by Michigan head coach Fritz Crisler in 1945 against an Army team under head coach "Colonel" Earl "Red" Blaik. 

When F. Scott Fitzgerald was living at La Paix, on the Turnbull estate in Baltimore, in 1933, he called Asa Bushnell, Princeton’s graduate manager of athletics and a clubmate of Fitzgerald’s, at 3 AM. “Get a pencil and paper,” said Fitzgerald. “I have some suggestions for Fritz Crisler.” Fitzgerald then explained his ideas that led to the two-platoon system, and Chrisler wrote back saying the plan had many virtues and would be adopted on the condition that it would be called “the Fitzgerald system“. Fitzgerald wrote back and said he guessed they better keep “the Fitzgerald system” in reserve. But that’s where the idea came from. [See Andrew Turnbull’s biography of Fitzgerald.]

Michigan lost the game 28–7, but Crisler's use of eight players who played only on offense, eight who played only on defense, and three that played both, impressed Blaik enough for him to adopt it for his own team. Blaik, a former soldier himself, coined the "platoon" terminology in reference to the type of military unit. Between 1946 and 1950, Blaik's two-platoon teams twice finished the season ranked second in the Associated Press polls and never finished lower than 11th.

In 1954, the NCAA adopted new rules which effectively reinstalled the one-platoon system. The revised rules allowed only one player to be substituted between plays, putting an end the mass substitution of offensive and defensive units. Tennessee head coach "General" Robert Neyland praised the change as the end of "chickenshit football".

In 1958, LSU coach Paul Dietzel came up with a unique three-platoon system. It consisted of three teams of 11 different players, and was designed to keep his players from being fatigued in an era when most players started on both offense and defense. Instead of replacing individual players during the game, Dietzel would bring in an entirely new set of players between plays and series. The three teams were called the White Team (the first-string offense and defense), the Gold (Go) Team (the second-string offense), and the Chinese Bandits (the second-string defense).  The system worked, as the Tigers went undefeated and won the national championship. The Chinese Bandits, the second-string defensive unit, which consisted of less-talented but ferocious players, became hugely popular with LSU fans and remains one of the most legendary pieces of LSU football history.

After the 1964 season, twelve years since the mandate requiring one-platoon, the NCAA repealed the rules enforcing its use and allowed an unlimited amount of player substitutions. This allowed, starting with the 1965 season, teams to form separate offensive and defensive units as well as "special teams" which would be employed in kicking situations. The reinstatement of the two-platoon system allowed players to become more specialized by focusing on a limited number of plays and skills related to their specific position. With players now fresher, coaches could now build their teams for speed and agility rather than brute strength and endurance; Don Coryell took advantage of the quarterbacks and wide receivers that were overlooked in the days of one-platoon ball to create one of the first predominantly passing offenses in top-level football. This, in turn, prompted defenses to respond in kind with wider-open defenses that emphasized linebackers and defensive backs, which in turn led to the rise of modern defenses such as the 4–3 defense and 3–4 defense and led to earlier defenses with more defensive linemen becoming obsolete. By the early 1970s, however, some university administrators, coaches and others were calling for a return to the days of one-platoon football, to save money spent by athletic departments.

See also
 One-platoon system
 Platoon system

Footnotes

American football terminology